Parental Guidance (TC: PG家長指引) is a Cantopop album by Edmond Leung.

Track listing
Parental Guidance (PG家長指引)
Mysteries In The World (瀛寰搜奇)
Anniversary (週年紀念)
Once Is Enough (一次就夠)
My Destiny (我的命運)
A Date With You (約你)
Someone Miss You (有個人很想你)
Look At Me (看我)
Bird (鳥)
Kitaro (喜多郎)
My Destiny (Remix)
Look At Me (Piano Version)

Music awards

External links

Edmond Leung albums
2000 albums
Cantonese-language albums